Gry-Anette Rekanes Amundsen (born 7 July 1973) is a Norwegian politician for the Progress Party.

She was elected to the Nome municipal council, Telemark county council and deputy leader of Telemark Progress Party. In the 2013 election she was elected as a deputy representative to the Parliament of Norway from Telemark, serving until 2017. She met during 46 days of parliamentary session.

In July 2009 she married fellow politician Per-Willy Amundsen. They divide their time between Oslo and their rural estate in Flåbygd in Telemark. In addition, they own a house together in Per-Willy Amundsen's native Harstad.

References

1973 births
Living people
People from Nome, Norway
Progress Party (Norway) politicians
Politicians from Telemark
Deputy members of the Storting
Women members of the Storting
21st-century Norwegian politicians
21st-century Norwegian women politicians